North Union Street Historic District is a national historic district located at Concord, Cabarrus County, North Carolina. The district encompasses 150 contributing buildings in a predominantly residential section of Concord. The area developed after 1870 and includes notable examples of Greek Revival and Late Victorian style architecture. Located in the district are the First Presbyterian Church, the Associate Reformed Presbyterian Church, Forest Hill Methodist Church, the First Baptist Church, the (Former) All Saints Episcopal Church, and the First United Presbyterian Church.

It was listed on the National Register of Historic Places in 1986.

References

Historic districts on the National Register of Historic Places in North Carolina
Greek Revival architecture in North Carolina
Victorian architecture in North Carolina
Buildings and structures in Cabarrus County, North Carolina
National Register of Historic Places in Cabarrus County, North Carolina